The 1933 Rutland and Stamford by-election was held on 21 November 1933.  The by-election was held due to the death of the incumbent Conservative MP, Neville Smith-Carington.  It was won by the Conservative candidate Lord Willoughby de Eresby.

References

1933 elections in the United Kingdom
By-elections to the Parliament of the United Kingdom in East Midlands constituencies
1933 in England
Politics of Rutland
By-elections to the Parliament of the United Kingdom in Lincolnshire constituencies
20th century in Rutland
20th century in Lincolnshire